Zonosaurus quadrilineatus, the four-lined girdled lizard, is a lizard species native to an area of approximately 3,300 km around Toliara in south-western Madagascar, and is found in dry habitats from sand dunes to forests. It is known to occur at elevations close to sea level.

References

External links

Zonosaurus
Reptiles described in 1867
Taxa named by Alfred Grandidier